Pietro Torrisi (born 20 January 1940) aka "Peter McCoy" is an Italian stuntman and actor. He appeared in more than 100 films since 1960.

Selected filmography

References

Footnotes

Sources

External links 

1940 births
Living people
Italian male film actors
Italian stunt performers